Robert Molesworth, 1st Viscount Molesworth PC (Ire) (7 September 1656 – 22 May 1725) was an Anglo-Irish politician and writer.

Molesworth came from an old Northamptonshire family. He married Hon. Letitia Coote, daughter of Richard Coote, 1st Baron Coote, and Mary St. George. His father Robert (d. 1656) was a Cromwellian who made a fortune in Dublin, largely by provisioning Cromwell's army; Robert Molesworth the younger supported William of Orange and was made William's ambassador to Denmark. In 1695 he became a prominent member of the Privy Council of Ireland. The same year he stood for Dublin County in the Irish House of Commons, a seat he held until 1703. Subsequently, he represented Swords until 1715. In the following year, he was created Viscount Molesworth, of Swords, in the Peerage of Ireland.

Molesworth's An Account of Denmark, as it was in the Year 1692 (published 1694) was somewhat influential in the burgeoning field of political science in the period.  He made a case for comparative political analysis, comparing the political situation of a country to the health of an individual; a disease, he reasoned, can only be diagnosed by comparing it to its instantiation in other people (Thompson, 495).

Life and career

Robert Molesworth was born on 7 September 1656, four days after the death of his father; his mother Judith Bysse later remarried Sir William Tichborne of Beaulieu. He was probably raised by his mother's family, the Bysses, at Brackenstown, near Swords, County Dublin.

In 1720, Molesworth and his grandson lost a significant investment in the South Sea Bubble. In Parliament, since his colleagues suggested there was no law under which to punish the perpetrators, he called for the Commons to "upon this occasion follow the example of the ancient Romans, who, having no law against parricide, because their legislators supposed no son could be so unnaturally wicked as to embrue his hands in his father's blood, made one to punish so heinous a crime as soon as it was committed; and adjudged the guilty wretch to be thrown alive, sewn up in a sack, into the Tiber". He concluded that he would see the same punishment applied to the directors of the South Sea Company, calling them the parricides of their country.

Family

With his wife Letitia, Molesworth had eleven sons and six daughters:

 John Molesworth, 2nd Viscount Molesworth of Swords (4 December 1679 – 17 or 18 February 1725/26). Ambassador at the Court of Tuscany and Sardinia in 1710 and 1720. He married Mary, daughter and co-heir of Thomas Middleton Esq. of Stansted Mountfitchet, Essex, by whom he had a posthumous daughter Mary, who married Frederick Gore Esq., M.P.
 Field Marshal Richard Molesworth, 3rd Viscount Molesworth of Swords (1680/1 - 12 October 1758). Aide-de-Camp to the Duke of Marlborough at the Battle of Ramilles, where he saved the Duke's life. He later became a General and rose to Fieldmarshal. 
 He married 1stly Jane Lucas and had 3 daughters: 
Mary (wife of Robert Rochfort, 1st Earl of Belvedere).
Letitia (wife of Lt. Colonel James Molesworth).
Amelia (died unm 30 Jan 1758)
 Richard married 2ndly Mary, daughter of Rev. William Usher, Archdeacon of Clonfert and had a son and six daughters:
Richard Nassau Molesworth (4th Viscount)
Henrietta (wife of Rt. Hon John Staples of Lissan House, Co. Londonderry. Their daughter Charlotte married William Lenox-Conyngham of Springhill, Co. Londonderry, father of Sir William Fitzwilliam Lenox-Conyngham. Another daughter Frances married Richard Ponsonby, Bishop of Derry and Raphoe).
Louisa (wife of William Ponsonby, 1st Baron Ponsonby, then William Fitzwilliam, 4th Earl Fitzwilliam)
Charlotte
Elizabeth (wife of James Stewart Esq. of Killymoon)
and Mary & Melosina who tragically died with their mother in the fire at their London house, 6 May 1763.

 Hon. Robert Molesworth I (living in 1688)
 Captain The Hon. William Molesworth (1688 - ), MP for Philipstown. His son Robert became 6th Viscount Molesworth. Married Anne, eldest daughter of Robert Adair Esq. of Holybrook, Co. Wicklow.
 Major The Hon. Edward Molesworth (born c.1689, died 29 November 1768). Married firstly, in Sept 1718 Catherine Middleton, daughter of Thomas Middleton, with whom he had a son Robert. Edward married as his second wife Mary Renouard and had a son John (d.1791). John's son was the Rev. John Molesworth (d.1877), whose sons included Sir Guildford Lindsey Molesworth (d. 1925) and solicitor John Molesworth (d.1886), the grandfather of Margaret Patricia Molesworth (1904–1985) who is the grandmother of Sophie, Duchess of Edinburgh.  Another son was the Rev. Rennell Molesworth (died 1906), grandfather of Lady Mogg née Margaret Molesworth (1914-2018).
 Hon. Coote Molesworth I (born c.1689 - )
 Hon. Robert Molesworth II (born c.1692)
 Hon. Walter Molesworth (born after 1692, between Robert II and Letitia II, died 1773). He left children.
 Hon. Coote Molesworth II M.D. (born 1698, died 9 November 1782)
 Hon. Bysse Molesworth (born 1700, died 1779). Married 7 Dec 1731, Elizabeth Cole, sister of John Cole, 1st Baron Mountflorence and widow of Edward Archdall Esq. of Castle Archdall, Co. Fermanagh.
 Hon. Robert Molesworth III (born c.1702, died aged c.10 of smallpox)
 Hon. Juliana Molesworth (died unm 1759)
 Hon. Margaret Molesworth (1677–1684)
 Hon. Mary Molesworth (1682–1716), a celebrated beauty and poet. Married George Monk Esq. of Dublin.
 Hon Letitia Molesworth I (living in 1688)
 Hon. Charlotte Amelia Molesworth (born c.1691 - ). Married Capt. William Tichborne, younger son of Henry Tichborne, 1st Baron Ferrard who was her cousin on the Bysse side 
 Hon Letitia Molesworth II (born 7 or 8 March 1697). Married Edward Bolton Esq. of Brazeel, Co. Dublin

Robert also appears to have had a natural son:

 John Phillips of Swords, Co. Dublin. His son was Molesworth Phillips who sailed with Captain Cook.

Death and succession

The 1st Viscount died in Dublin on 22 May 1725 at the age of sixty-nine and was buried in Swords. His widow, Letitia, died "of a great cold" on St Patrick's Day 1729 and was buried privately in St. Audoen's Church Dublin. Their eldest son, John, succeeded as 2nd Viscount Molesworth in 1725. John, in turn, was succeeded by his younger brother Richard a year later in 1726.

Arms

References

Sources 
29 Molesworth Street on turtlebunbury.com
Thompson, Martyn P. "A Note on "Reason" and "History" in Late Seventeenth Century Political Thought." Political Theory, Vol. 4, No. 4. (1976), 491–504.

1656 births
1725 deaths
Members of the Privy Council of Ireland
Viscounts in the Peerage of Ireland
Peers of Ireland created by George I
Diplomatic peers
Members of the Parliament of Ireland (pre-1801) for County Dublin constituencies
Irish MPs 1695–1699
Irish MPs 1703–1713
Irish MPs 1713–1714
Members of the pre-1707 English Parliament for constituencies in Cornwall
English MPs 1695–1698
English MPs 1705–1707
Whig (British political party) MPs
Members of the Parliament of Great Britain for English constituencies
Members of the Parliament of Great Britain for constituencies in Cornwall
British MPs 1707–1708
British MPs 1715–1722
Fellows of the Royal Society
Ambassadors of England to Denmark